The Russian Volleyball Super League 2009–10 is the 19th official season of Russian Volleyball Super League.

The Championship is held in two phases. In the preliminary stage each team played each other twice - once at home and once away. The top eight teams went into the playoffs. Quarterfinals, semifinals and finals for first and third places were the best of five . Unlike the previous season there was no playoff for the fifth to eighth places. The teams placed ninth to twelfth competed against each other over another twelve games with the two bottom sides being relegated.

Teams

Regular season

External links 
 Volleyball in Russia season 09–10

Russian Volleyball Super League
2009 in volleyball
2010 in volleyball
2009 in Russian sport
2010 in Russian sport